David G. Messerschmitt (born May 21, 1945) is an engineer and professor emeritus at the University of California, Berkeley in the Department of Electrical Engineering and Computer Sciences in the UC Berkeley College of Engineering. He retired from UC Berkeley in 2005. At present he is conducting research at Berkeley, is a visiting professor in the Software Business Laboratory at the Helsinki University of Technology, and is doing research on interstellar communications at the SETI Institute. Messerschmitt also serves on the Advisory Council of METI (Messaging Extraterrestrial Intelligence).

Biography
His notable past research includes the advancement of digital transmission systems, including contributions that made digital telephony possible over the existing telephone network, the use of VLSI to realize functions in the telephone network, and VLSI architectures to solve signal processing challenges. His work has increasingly been devoted to software. In 1984 Messerschmitt wrote Blosim, a software-based block diagram simulation system for digital signal processing simulations. He also contributed to a successor to Blosim called Ptolemy, which is still being actively developed and used. When the UC Berkeley School of Information was created he co-founded courses on network applications and strategic technology, and later served as interim dean of the school. His research interests and curriculum development for the past decade have been largely devoted to the business of software and economics of the software industry.

Messerschmitt graduated with a B.S. in electrical engineering from the University of Colorado in 1967, and received his M.S. and Ph.D. in computer, information, and control engineering from the University of Michigan in 1971. He was a Bell Labs researcher until 1977, when he left to take an academic position at Berkeley.

In 1999 Messerschmitt received the IEEE Alexander Graham Bell Medal "for fundamental contributions to communications theory and practice, including VLSI for signal processing, and simulation and modeling software". He was elected a member of the US National Academy of Engineering in 1990 for contributions to telecommunication theory and practice and to engineering education.

In 2007 Messerschmitt co-founded the Software business community (SWBC) in cooperation with the Helsinki University of Technology.

Books

References

External links
Messerschmitt's bio at IEEE History Center, written 1999
Messerschmitt's page on the Software Business Community (SWBC) platform

1945 births
Living people
People from Denver
American electrical engineers
Scientists at Bell Labs
University of Michigan College of Engineering alumni
University of Colorado alumni
UC Berkeley College of Engineering faculty
Members of the United States National Academy of Engineering